Seetha Kumari Ehelepola (born 9 May 1940 – died 7 August 2013 as සීතා කුමාරි ඇහැලේපොළ) [Sinhala]), was an actress in Sri Lankan cinema, theater and television. One of the earliest pillars in Sri Lankan film history, Ehelepola had a career that spanned more than four decades. She was notable to act in many motherly roles in television serials as well as films.

Personal life
Kumari was born on 9 May 1940 in Ehelepola village, Matale. She has one son, Pradeep Kumara Abeyratne, who currently lives in Italy.

She died on 7 August 2013 due to a sudden heart attack at the age of 73. After the body being placed in the Colombo Art Gallery on 10 August 2013 from 10 am to 4 pm, funeral took place on the same day at Borella Cemetery.

Career
Her elder sister was married to Matale. After the husband's sudden death, Kumari with her son stayed at elder sister's house. The son was three years old at that time. One day, Ananda Jayaratne came to the house of sister to meet sister's son. When Ananda saw her that day, he asked to act in his film. She entered the cinema industry in 1968 with Ananda Jayaratne's film Adarai Karunavai with the role as a "servant". She was 25 years old at that time. She acted in more than 60 films since 1968 until her last appearance in 2011 film Sinhawalokanaya. Some of her popular films include Desa Nisa, Wathsala Akka, Ran Salu, Akkara Paha and Segawunu Menika.

After the cinema, Kumari started to act in Dhamma Jagoda's stage plays. Some of her popular stage plays are Wes Muhuna, Weniyan Kalu Weniyan and Wessanthara. Kumari learnt dancing from Shesha Palihakkara. After filmmaker A.B. Raj saw her at an exhibition, she offered a role in his film Ramyalatha. Her first lead role in films came through film Sirimalee. Then in 1960, she played the lead role opposite to Gamini Fonseka in the film Pirimiyek Nisa. However, she quit from cinema due to father's death in the following year.

Her maiden television acting came through Dath Kekulu Paala directed by Sriyani Amarasena in 1990. Since then, she acted in many popular serials including, Giju, Saapa Nokarav Daruwane, Girikula, Ramya Suramya, Maya, Dussaranayo and Ulamage Rathriya. She continued to act in single episode poya day television serials Sansare Piya Satahan directed by Ananda Abenayake and Sitha Niwana Katha directed by Dayaratne Ratagedara for many years with the role "Granny".

Selected television serials
 Dath Kekulu Paala
 Dooli Pinatharu
 Dussaranayo
 Eka Iththaka Mal 
 Giju
 Girikula
 Maya
 Meghayen Eha
 Monarathanna
 Nannadunanni
 Ramya Suramya
 Ran Samanalayo
 Saapa Nokarav Daruwane
 Sanda Mudunata
 Sansare Piya Satahan
 Sitha Niwana Katha
 Smarana Samapthi
 Ulamage Rathriya

Awards
Kumari has received many awards at local drama festivals.

 Presidential Award in 1986 for the film Wathsala Akka
 Critics Award for the film Tharanaya in 1998
 Best Supporting Actress at Sumathi Awards in 2000 for the serial Nannadunanni
 Presidential Award in 2005 for the film Pawuru Walalu
 Excellence Awards at Sarasaviya Film Festival in 2008

Filmography

References

External links

2013 deaths
1940 births
Sri Lankan film actresses